Alsactide (INN) (brand name Synchrodyn 1-17 or simply Synchrodyn, former development code name Hoechst 433), also known as alisactide, is a synthetic peptide and analogue of adrenocorticotropic hormone (ACTH) which is used in Italy as a diagnostic agent in kidney function for adrenal insufficiency. Like ACTH, alsactide is thought to act as a non-selective agonist of the melanocortin receptors, including the ACTH receptor (MC2R). However, it appears to show a different profile of receptor selectivity relative to ACTH, as it apparently demonstrated no evidence of inhibition of endogenous ACTH in Addison's disease patients.

See also
 Tetracosactide

References

Peptides
Melanocortin receptor agonists